Wynne's Folly, also known as the Clarke House, is a historic plantation house located near Engelhard, Hyde County, North Carolina. It was built about 1848, and is two-story, five bay by five bay, vernacular Greek Revival style frame dwelling.  It sits on a low brick pier foundation, shallow pyramidal roof pierced by pairs of interior end chimneys, and a wide frieze and overhanging cornice.

It was added to the National Register of Historic Places in 1977.

Wynne's Folly was built for Richard Wynn, who wished to impress a woman.

References

Plantation houses in North Carolina
Houses on the National Register of Historic Places in North Carolina
Greek Revival houses in North Carolina
Houses completed in 1848
Houses in Hyde County, North Carolina
National Register of Historic Places in Hyde County, North Carolina